Oreopanax stenophyllus is an evergreen shrub or treelet in the family Araliaceae. It is endemic to cloud forests on the eastern slopes of the Peruvian Andes, between 2800 and 3700 meters above sea level.

References

Flora of Peru
stenophyllus
Vulnerable plants
Taxonomy articles created by Polbot